Rankin Airport  is a county-owned, public-use airport located one mile (2 km) west of the central business district of Rankin, a city in Upton County, Texas, United States.

Facilities and aircraft 
For the 12-month period ending April 21, 2007, the airport had 700 general aviation aircraft operations, an average of 58 per month.

References

External links 
 

Airports in Texas
Transportation in Upton County, Texas
Buildings and structures in Upton County, Texas